Ingrid Künzel (born 29 January 1938) is a German former swimmer. She competed in two events at the 1956 Summer Olympics.

References

1938 births
Living people
German female swimmers
Olympic swimmers of the United Team of Germany
Swimmers at the 1956 Summer Olympics
Sportspeople from Darmstadt
20th-century German women